William Devaughn Stumpf (born February 27, 1982) is a Filipino-American commercial model and actor.

Biography
He entered the Pinoy Big Brother house, during its Celebrity Edition 2, and became the fourth big placer of that season. He arrived in the Philippines in 2004 without knowing a single word of Tagalog. His biological father is of mixed Filipino and African American lineage while his mother is of German descent.

He was a former talent of ABS-CBN and in 2010. He moved to GMA Network until 2013 but he decided to quit from show business as a contract of Sparkle (formerly GMA Artist Center) then returned in 2017 via Trops and My Love from the Star.

He is now a father to a baby boy named Magnus Orion. His first child with Filipina-Dutch girlfriend international emcee Cay Kuijpers was born on November 9, 2019.

Filmography

Films

Drama series

TV series

MV appearance
 MasaRap! (Schizophrenia, 2013)

References

External links

1982 births
Filipino male film actors
Filipino male models
Pinoy Big Brother contestants
Star Magic
Living people
People from Büdingen
Filipino people of African-American descent
ABS-CBN personalities
GMA Network personalities
Converts to evangelical Christianity
Filipino Christians
Filipino evangelicals
Filipino male television actors